Firebrand may refer to:
 A person with a penchant for militancy in speech and/or action

Vehicles
 Blackburn Firebrand, an aircraft constructed for the Royal Navy
 HMS Firebrand, any of several vessels that the Royal Navy operated
 CFAV Firebrand (YTR 562), a fireboat in the Canadian Armed Forces Maritime Command

Arts
 The Firebrand (1922 film), a silent film directed by Alan James
 The Firebrand (1962 film), a film directed by Maury Dexter
 Firebrand (2019 film), a Indian Marathi-language drama film
 Firebrand (upcoming film), a historical drama film 
 The Firebrand (Bradley novel), a 1987 novel by Marion Zimmer Bradley
 Firebrand (DC Comics), a DC Comics comic book character
 Firebrand (Green Rider series), a 2017 novel by Kristen Britain
 The Firebrand (Kemp novel), a 2003 novel by Debra A. Kemp
 Firebrand (Marvel Comics), a Marvel Comics comic book character
 Firebrand, a character from the Ghosts'n Goblins series

Other
 Firebrand (horse), a British Thoroughbred racehorse
 Firebrand Games, a video game company
 The Firebrand (1897–1904), an anarchist newspaper in the United States first published as Free Society
 A nickname given to Fiach McHugh O'Byrne (1534–1597), an Irish rebel